Weinsheim may refer to several places in Germany both in Rhineland-Palatinate:

Weinsheim, Bitburg-Prüm 
Weinsheim, Bad Kreuznach